Official Denial is a 1993 made-for-television science fiction film about a man who is abducted by aliens. It is eventually revealed that the aliens are in reality humans from the future.

The film was shot on the Gold Coast, Queensland, Australia.

References

External links

Australian science fiction films
1994 films
1990s science fiction films
Films directed by Brian Trenchard-Smith
1990s English-language films
Australian television films
1990s Australian films